The canton of Terrasson-Lavilledieu is an administrative division of the Dordogne department, southwestern France. Its borders were modified at the French canton reorganisation which came into effect in March 2015. Its seat is in Terrasson-Lavilledieu.

It consists of the following communes:

Archignac
Borrèze
Calviac-en-Périgord
Carlux
Carsac-Aillac
La Cassagne
Condat-sur-Vézère
Les Coteaux Périgourdins
La Dornac
La Feuillade
Jayac
Nadaillac
Paulin
Pazayac
Pechs-de-l'Espérance
Prats-de-Carlux
Saint-Crépin-et-Carlucet
Sainte-Mondane
Saint-Geniès
Saint-Julien-de-Lampon
Salignac-Eyvigues
Simeyrols
Terrasson-Lavilledieu
Veyrignac

References

Cantons of Dordogne